Bradley vs. Alexander was a boxing match that featured two undefeated reigning light welterweight champions of the world. The winner of the fight was slated to fight against Amir Khan after his unanimous decision win against Marcos Maidana

The fight
Bradley won a technical decision against Alexander in 10 rounds. Alexander suffered a cut above his right eye in the third round after an accidental butt.  The bout was stopped about a minute into the tenth round after another accidental head clash, which left Alexander unable to continue.

Undercard

Televised
Junior welterweight unified championship bout: Timothy Bradley(c)   vs.  Devon Alexander(c)
Bradley defeats Alexander by technical decision in round 10.
Heavyweight bout: Bermane Stiverne  vs.  Kertson Manswell
Stiverne defeats Manswell via TKO at 1:52 of round 2.
Welterweight bout: James de la Rosa  vs.  Allen Conyers
Conyers defeats de la Rosa by unanimous decision.
Light welterweight bout: Emanuel Augustus  vs.  Vernon Paris
Paris defeats Augustus  by points.

Untelevised

Light welterweight bout: Julio Diaz  vs.  Pavel Miranda
Diaz defeats Miranda via TKO at 2:17 of round 8.
Welterweight bout: Kendall Holt  vs.  Lenin Arroyo
Holt defeats Arroyo via TKO at 1:50 of round 1.
Super middleweight bout: Darryl Cunningham  vs.  Alberto Mercedes
Cunningham defeats Mercedes by unanimous decision.
Light heavyweight bout: Marcus Oliveira  vs.  Demetrius Jenkins
Oliveira defeats Jenkins by unanimous decision.
Light middleweight bout: Julian Williams  vs.  Torrence King
Williams defeats King via TKO at 0:28 of round 1.

External links
Summary

References

Boxing matches
2011 in boxing
Boxing in Michigan
Sports in Pontiac, Michigan
2011 in sports in Michigan
Boxing on HBO
January 2011 sports events in the United States